Psilorhynchus is a genus of fish in the family Psilorhynchidae native to South Asia. This genus is the only member of its family. The members of Psilorhynchus are small benthic fishes which occur in rivers and streams with fast to swift currents, hence they are often referred to a torrent minnows. They are distributed in southern Asia, in the Indo-Burma region and the Western Ghats. The genus is the sister group to the family Cyprinidae, and with that family the Psilorhynchidae makes up the superfamily Cyprinoidea, with all the other cypriniform families in the superfamily Cobitoidea.

Species
There are currently 29 recognized species in this genus:
 Psilorhynchus amplicephalus Arunachalam, Muralidharan & Sivakumar, 2007
 Psilorhynchus arunachalensis (Nebeshwar, Bagra & D. N. Das, 2007)
 Psilorhynchus balitora (F. Hamilton, 1822) 
 Psilorhynchus brachyrhynchus Conway & Britz, 2010 
 Psilorhynchus breviminor Conway & Mayden, 2008
 Psilorhynchus chakpiensis Shangningam & Vishwanath, 2013 
 Psilorhynchus gokkyi Conway & Britz, 2010 
 Psilorhynchus hamiltoni Conway, Dittmer, Jezisek & H. H. Ng, 2013 
 Psilorhynchus homaloptera Hora & Mukerji, 1935 
 Psilorhynchus kaladanensis Lal Ramliana, Lal Nuntluanga & Lal Ronunga, 2015 
 Psilorhynchus khopai Lal Ramliana, Solo, Lal Ronunga & Lal Nuntluanga, 2014 
 Psilorhynchus konemi Shangningam & Vishwanath, 2016 
 Psilorhynchus maculatus Shangningam & Vishwanath, 2013 
 Psilorhynchus magnaoculus Bungdon Shangningam and Laishram Kosygin, 2021
 Psilorhynchus melissa Conway & Kottelat, 2010  
 Psilorhynchus microphthalmus Vishwanath & Manojkumar, 1995
 Psilorhynchus nepalensis Conway & Mayden, 2008
 Psilorhynchus ngathanu Shangningam & Vishwanath, 2013 
 Psilorhynchus nudithoracicus Tilak & Husain, 1980 
 Psilorhynchus olliei Conway & Britz, 2015 
 Psilorhynchus pavimentatus Conway & Kottelat, 2010 
 Psilorhynchus piperatus Conway & Britz, 2010 
 Psilorhynchus pseudecheneis Menon & A. K. Datta, 1964 
 Psilorhynchus rahmani Conway & Mayden, 2008
 Psilorhynchus robustus Conway & Kottelat, 2007
 Psilorhynchus rowleyi Hora & Misra, 1941 
 Psilorhynchus sucatio (F. Hamilton, 1822) 
 Psilorhynchus tenura Arunachalam & Muralidharan, 2008
 Psilorhynchus tysoni  Conway & Pinion, 2016

References

 
Freshwater fish genera
Psilorhynchidae
Taxa named by John McClelland (doctor)